Estácio de Sá University or Universidade Estácio de Sá is a private university in Rio de Janeiro, Brazil. It is named after the Portuguese knight and military officer Estácio de Sá, who was the founder of the city of Rio de Janeiro.

External links
Official website

Universities in Brazil
Private universities and colleges in Brazil
Universities and colleges in Rio de Janeiro (city)